Federal University Gashua (FUGashua) is a university based in Yobe State, northeastern Nigeria. It is a learning and research institution that seeks to solve immediate needs of the society and give every person the opportunity to acquire knowledge.

The university was established in 2013 by President Goodluck Jonathan. This was done to give every state of Nigeria (those without a federal university) access to higher education and to give all states equal access to education. Yobe State is listed as one of the educationally disadvantaged with low enrollment in schools and high rate of illiteracy.

In its Education Sector reform and development, the Federal Government of Nigeria, in 2010, approved the establishment of twelve (12) universities in the six geopolitical zones of the country. This was to expand access to tertiary education for Nigerians. For effective take off of the universities, an Implementation Committee which includes National Universities Commission (NUC), the Tertiary Education Trust Fund (TETFUND) and other relevant stakeholders was constituted. The Committee held consultations with governors of the states for the new universities and inspected the proposed sites before submitting its report on 15 November 2010. The implementation of the committee's report was in phases. The implementation of the first phase started with the establishment of nine Universities, in February 2011. The implementation of the second phase involved the establishment of three Universities including the FUGashua in February 2013. On 18 February 2013, Professor Shehu Abdul Rahaman was appointed Vice-Chancellor, and Sulu Dauda, Registrar (pioneers).
In June 2015, FUGashua matriculated its 240 pioneer students. Three years after the maiden matriculation, student population grew significantly, and in February 2018, 990 students were matriculated.

University Library 
Its an academic library that was established in 2013 to support teaching, learning and research to meet the mission, objectives of the university. the library has information resources that support the courses offered which is headed by a University librarian. present university librarian is Dr. Adam Gambo Saleh.

Academic 
FUGashua offers over 20 courses in five faculties.

Faculty of Agriculture 
Agricultural Economics and Extension Agronomy Animal Science Fisheries and Aquaculture Forestry and Wildlife Management  Home Economics and Management/Economics

Faculty of Art and Humanities 
English Language  History and International Studies   Islamic Studies

Faculty of Management Science 
Accounting Business Administration  Public Administration

Faculty of Sciences 
Biochemistry Biology Chemistry  Physics   Mathematics Computer Science

Faculty of Social Science 
Economics and Development Studies                  Geography                                         Political Science                                             Psychology                                             Sociology

References

Yobe State
 
Federal universities of Nigeria